Freemasons' Hall may refer to:
Freemasons' Hall, Copenhagen
Freemasons' Hall, Edinburgh
Freemasons' Hall, London

Architectural disambiguation pages